Patrick "Pat" J. McCabe (born April 15, 1969) is a retired professional lacrosse player from the United States. In 2006, McCabe was elected to the US Lacrosse Hall of Fame.

College career
McCabe attended Syracuse University, where he was named All-American four times, including three times to the first team. Pat was also presented with the Schmeisser Award as the nations most outstanding defensive player in 1990. McCabe won three NCAA Championships at Syracuse.

Professional career
McCabe played defense for the Long Island Lizards of Major League Lacrosse from the 2001 season until he retired following the 2006 season. He also played 11 seasons for the New York Saints of the National Lacrosse League (1992–2002), and was chosen to play on Team USA at the 2002 Heritage Cup. He also coached the Saints in 2003 and the Anaheim Storm in 2004.

International career
As well as playing professionally, McCabe represented Team USA in international tournaments in 1988 with the under-19 National Team, and the 1998 and 2006 National Teams in the World Lacrosse Championships.

Statistics

MLL

NLL

Awards

See also
 Syracuse Orange men's lacrosse

References

1969 births
Living people
National Lacrosse League players
American lacrosse players
Major League Lacrosse players
Major League Lacrosse major award winners
Syracuse Orange men's lacrosse players